The Miss Nicaragua 2005 pageant, was held on March 5, 2005 in Managua, after several weeks of events.  At the conclusion of the final night of competition, Daniela Clerk from Managua won the title. She represented Nicaragua at Miss Universe 2005 held in Thailand later that year. The rest of the finalists would enter different pageants.

Placements

Special awards

 Miss Photogenic - Masaya - Meyling Vilchez
 Best Hair - Carazo - Fanny Ramirez
 Best Smile - Granada - Rebecca Reynoso
 Most Beautiful Face - Tipitapa - Shantall Quintero
 Miss Congeniality - Esteli - Ariadna Urrutia
 Miss Internet - Leon - Sandra Rios (by votes of Miss Nicaragua Webpage)

.

Official Contestants

Judges

 Pierre Pierson - Nicaragua Vice-Minister of Culture
 Luis Morales Alonso - Nicaraguan Painter
 Margarita Pasos - TV host of Margarita te voy a contar talk show and Director of Successfactor Internacional Business Coaching & Training
 Carlos Garzon B. - Nicaraguan Goldsmith
 Carlos Alberto Rombaldo -  Department of Computing Engineering and Digital System - UNICA
 Edwin Dominguez -  Professional Photographer
 Ivan Solorzano -  Regional Manager of Budget Car Rental
 Claudia Alaniz -  Miss Nicaragua 1998
 Abraham R Espinoza - Representative of Televicentro

.

Special Guests

 Ballet Folklórico Nicaragüense - "Moralimpia"
 Carlos Barrios - "Un Dia Mas"
.

Trivia

 Daniela Clerk Castillo is Miss Nicaragua 1995 Linda Clerk Castillo's younger sister.
 Shantall Quintero (who now goes by Shantall Lacayo) is an international fashion designer who became a runner up in Project Runway Latin America Season 1 and later won Project Runway (season 19) after relocating to the United States. 
.

References

Miss Nicaragua
2005 in Nicaragua
2005 beauty pageants